= Asbotos =

Ancient Town

Asbotos (Ancient Greek: Ἄσβωτος) was a town in ancient Thessaly. It is unlocated. It may have been a polis (city-state) in the 4th and 3rd centuries BCE.
